Urtica pilulifera, also known as the Roman nettle, is a herbaceous annual flowering plant in the family Urticaceae.

Description 
Urtica pilulifera, also known as the Roman nettle, can grow up to around 2 feet tall. Its leaves have stinging hairs, which can irritate the skin.

Distribution
Urtica pilulifera is native to the countries around the Mediterranean, and eastwards into the Arabian Peninsula and Iran. It has been introduced into Belgium, Germany and Great Britain. It is no longer found in Britain.

References

Sources

 Sp. Pl. 2: 983. 1753
 
https://lisalodwick.com/2014/04/10/romannettle/#:~:text=Flora%20Europaea%20does%20tell%20us,north%20but%20is%20now%20rare.
https://pfaf.org/user/Plant.aspx?LatinName=Urtica+pilulifera
https://www.qld.gov.au/environment/land/management/soil/soil-properties/texture
https://www.abc.net.au/science/articles/2006/02/20/1574055.htm

External links
 

pilulifera
Plants described in 1753
Taxa named by Carl Linnaeus